The Dutch Confederation of Trade Unions (NVV) was a Dutch social-democratic trade union.

History
The NVV was founded in 1906 as a merger of fifteen smaller unions, as a result of the inability of the previous unions to control the radical elements of the workers movement in the railworkers' strike of 1903. The NVV was led by Henri Polak, who was a prominent member of the socialist Social Democratic Workers' Party.

During World War II the NVV was taken over by the German occupiers, its Dutch leader was Henk Woudenberg.  Under the German occupation the NVV was transformed into a  Nazi union. After the war these influences were purged and the NVV cooperated tightly with the centre left government to create a welfare state based on the principles of corporatism.

In the 1970s NVV membership began to decline due to depillarisation. Under the leadership of Wim Kok the NVV attempted to form a federation with  the Protestant Christian National Trade Union Federation (CNV) and the Catholic Dutch Catholic Trade Union Federation (NKV)  which could strengthen all three. The CNV, however, left the talks in 1973.  In 1976 the NVV and the NKV merged to form the Federation of Dutch Trade Unions (FNV).

Ideology
The NVV started out as a socialist union, in favour of class struggle, workers' ownership of the means of production, and the use of strikes. After the second world war it began to moderate its tone, becoming, social-democratic and cooperating in the creation of a welfare state and a corporatist economy.

Organization
The NVV has close formal, ideological and personal links with the socialist Social Democratic Workers' Party and later with the social-democratic PvdA. Together with the socialist VARA and several other organizations they formed the socialist pillar.

Presidents
1906: Henri Polak
1909: Jan Oudegeest
1919: Roel Stenhuis
1929: Evert Kupers
1940: Henk Woudenberg
1942: Vacant
1945: Evert Kupers
1949: Henk Oosterhuis
1956: Kees van Wingerden
1959: Derk Roemers
1965: André Kloos
1971: Harry ter Heide
1972: Wim Kok

Affiliates

References

External links
 Archief NVV at the International Institute of Social History

Trade unions in the Netherlands
1906 establishments in the Netherlands
1982 disestablishments in the Netherlands
National trade union centers of the Netherlands
Trade unions established in 1906
Trade unions disestablished in 1976